Frédéric Perrier (born 30 November 1974) is a French rower. He competed in the men's quadruple sculls event at the 2004 Summer Olympics.

References

1974 births
Living people
French male rowers
Olympic rowers of France
Rowers at the 2004 Summer Olympics
Sportspeople from Mâcon